The Oppo Neo 5 is the 3rd phone in the Oppo Neo Series. It is also known by the alias Oppo Neo 5 (4G) to distinguish it from other variants of the Neo 5 (Oppo Neo 5 (2015), Oppo Neo 5s). One of the selling points of the phone, as mentioned by the phones' official website, is a "Double-layer Metallic Structure" which Oppo claims gives the phone a thinner chassis and better heat dissipation.

References 

Oppo smartphones
Android (operating system) devices
Discontinued smartphones
Mobile phones with user-replaceable battery